Sticholotis rufoplagiata, is a species of lady beetle found in Sri Lanka.

The species is very similar to Sticholotis rugicollis, where both have fused elytral spots. But in S. rufoplagiata, this elytral spot is anteriorly clearly confluent.

References 

Coccinellidae
Insects of Sri Lanka
Beetles described in 1866